Disa is a female given name. It may be a short form of Hjördis and other names ending in -dis, or a variant of Desideria.

People
Disa, heroine in Swedish folklore
Disa Eythorsdottir (born 1965), American bridge player
Mike Disa (born 1965), American animator and film director
Stokkseyrar-Dísa (1668–1728), Icelandic magician

See also
Disa (disambiguation)
Hjördís

References